Thaba-Tseka is the capital city or camptown of the Thaba-Tseka District in Lesotho. It has a population of 15,248 (2016 census).

Thaba-Tseka was also the subject of the case studies in James Ferguson's book The Anti-Politics Machine, which identified the failures of outside-initiated development projects.

Infrastructure
In Thaba-Tseka, there are shopping facilities, a bank, a post office, various institutions of relief organizations, and a hospital.

References

External links

Populated places in Thaba-Tseka District
Thaba-Tseka District